Certified Hitmaker is the second studio album by American rapper Lil Mosey. It was released on November 8, 2019, by Mogul Vision Music and Interscope Records. This serves at the follow up to his 2018 release Northsbest. The album contains features from Chris Brown, Gunna, Trippie Redd and AJ Tracey. Every song on its standard edition was produced by Royce David, who also produced the majority of songs on Northsbest. It was reissued on February 7, 2020, coinciding with the release of Mosey's hit single "Blueberry Faygo". A deluxe edition, marketed as Certified Hitmaker (AVA Leak), was released on August 14, 2020, and includes additional features from Lil Baby and Lunay. Certified Hitmaker debuted at number 12 on the US Billboard 200, earning 23,000 album-equivalent units in its first week.

Certified Hitmaker was supported by three singles: "G Walk", "Stuck in a Dream" and "Live This Wild", as well as two additional singles: "Back At It" and "Top Gone", in the lead up to the release of its deluxe.

Background
On October 20, 2019, Lil Mosey released the first teaser to Certified Hitmaker which showcases an introduction to an artificial intelligence known as AVA who guides Mosey on his mission on Earth after leaving his homeworld. On October 29, an official album trailer was released which also announced his third upcoming studio album The Land of Make Believe. Certified Hitmaker was released on November 8 containing features from Chris Brown, Gunna, Trippie Redd, and AJ Tracey, after being preceded by three singles: "G Walk", "Stuck in a Dream" and "Live This Wild".

A deluxe edition, marketed as Certified Hitmaker (AVA Leak), was released on August 14, 2020. It was supported by two singles: "Back at It" and "Top Gone". Three new songs were also added to the tracklist, "Bands Out Tha Roof", "My Dues", and "Focus on Me". Interestingly, "Focus on Me" is Mosey's second self-produced song, the first being "Bust Down Cartier" which was released in early 2019. The deluxe follows a story that AVA leaked the extra tracks to satisfy Mosey fans until the release of his upcoming mixtape titled Universal, which is expected to be released in 2022. Universal would serve as a continuation of the narrative that began from Northsbest, from which Mosey left his homeworld "The Land of Make Believe" to Earth for a mission before returning home.

Singles
Certified Hitmaker was supported by a total of six singles. 
The first single, "G Walk" was released on June 7, 2019. The song features a guest appearance from Chris Brown. While the high-profile collaboration was initially unexpected, Mosey had notably sampled Brown's 2005 hit single "Yo (Excuse Me Miss)" in "Greet Her", the seventh song on Northsbest. The second single, "Stuck in a Dream" featuring Gunna was released on September 17, 2019. The music video was also released on Lil Mosey's YouTube channel the same day. The single peaked at number 62 on the US Billboard Hot 100 dated November 23, 2019, as well as number 34 on the Canadian Hot 100 chart. The third single, "Live This Wild" was released on November 5, 2019, a few days before the release of Certified Hitmaker. Its music video was released a week later on November 14, 2019. Although it failed to chart on the US Billboard Hot 100, it managed to peak at number 80 on the Canadian Hot 100. The fourth single, "Blueberry Faygo" was originally a unreleased song that was leaked online. It was being uploaded on to Spotify and other platforms under many different names. For a period of time the song kept being posted and taken down. Eventually, the song became one of the biggest trending songs on Spotify. The song was officially released on February 7, 2020, and was later included on the album's reissue on the same day. The music video was released on March 26, 2020, and was directed by Cole Bennett. The single became Lil Mosey's most successful song to date, peaking at number 8 on the US Billboard Hot 100. In Canada, the song peaked at number 8 on the Canadian Hot 100. It also managed to peaked at number 9 on the UK Singles Chart and number 62 on Billboard'''s Global 200 charts respectively. The fifth single, "Back At It" featuring Lil Baby was released on June 26, 2020, in the lead up to the album's deluxe. The song reached number 9 on the US Bubbling Under the Hot 100 chart. The final single, "Top Gone" featuring Lunay was released on August 5, 2020.Certified Hitmaker debuted at number 12 on the US Billboard 200 chart, earning 23,000 album-equivalent units in its first week. This became Lil Mosey's highest-charting album to date. The album also debuted at number 9 on the US Top R&B/Hip-Hop Albums chart. It ranked number 72 on the Billboard'' 200 year-end chart of 2020.

Track listing

Personnel
Lil Mosey – primary artist
Mike Tucci – mastering engineer
Patrizio Pigliapoco – mixer
Michael Garcia – music video director
Patrizio Pigliapoco and Royce David – recording engineers
Royce David – studio personnel

Charts

Weekly charts

Year-end charts

References

2019 albums
Lil Mosey albums
Albums produced by Cubeatz
Interscope Records albums